Darling Township may refer to:

Darling Township, Ontario, Canada
Darling Township, Morrison County, Minnesota, U.S.
Darling Township, Muskogee County, Oklahoma, U.S.

See also
Darlington Township (disambiguation)
Darling (disambiguation)

Township name disambiguation pages